This is a list of the best-selling albums in Austria that have been certified by the IFPI. Since January 1, 2013, BVMI certifies an album platinum for the shipment of 15,000 copies across Austria.
All albums in this list must have been certified for more than 100,000 copies.

Certifications for albums released in Austria depend upon their release date.

Gold and Platinum certification awards (Timeline) 

Albums

References 

Austria
Albums